The Cure for Love is a 1949 British comedy film starring and directed by Robert Donat. The cast also includes Renee Asherson and Dora Bryan. The film was based on a hit play of the same name by Walter Greenwood about a mild-mannered soldier returning home after the Second World War.

Production
Donat had appeared in the stage play in 1945. In 1948 it was announced he would make a film version for Alexander Korda. It was his sole feature credit as director, although he had directed on stage.

Francis Wignall was chosen out of 3,000 boys to play a lead role. Donat battled ill health during pre-production. The production was shot at Shepperton Studios, with sets designed by the art director Wilfred Shingleton.

Reception
Trade papers called the film a "notable box office attraction" in British cinemas in 1950. According to Kinematograph Weekly the 'biggest winners' at the box office in 1950 Britain were The Blue Lamp, The Happiest Days of Your Life, Annie Get Your Gun, The Wooden Horse, Treasure Island and Odette, with "runners up" being Stage Fright, White Heat, They Were Not Divided, Trio, Morning Departure, Destination Moon, Sands of Iwo Jima, Little Women, The Forsythe Saga, Father of the Bride, Neptune's Daughter, The Dancing Years, The Red Light, Rogues of Sherwood Forest, Fancy Pants, Copper Canyon, State Secret, The Cure for Love, My Foolish Heart, Stromboli, Cheaper by the Dozen, Pinky, Three Came Home, Broken Arrow and Black Rose.

Cast
 Robert Donat as Sergeant Jack Hardacre 
 Renée Asherson as Milly Southern 
 Marjorie Rhodes as Mrs. Sarah Hardacre 
 Charles Victor as Henry Lancaster 
 Thora Hird as Mrs. Dorbell 
 Dora Bryan as Jenny Jenkins 
 Gladys Henson as Mrs. Jenkins 
 John Stratton as Sam 
 Francis Wignall as Claude 
 Norman Partridge as Vicar 
 Edna Morris as Mrs. Harrison 
 Michael Dear as Albert  
 Tonie MacMillan as Mrs. Donald 
 Lilian Stanley as Mrs. Small 
 Margot Bryant as Mrs. Hooley 
 Lucille Gray as Tough girl 
 Jack Howarth as Hunter 
 Sam Kydd as Charlie Fox 
 Jack Rodney as Eddie 
 Reginald Green as Douglas 
 Johnny Catcher as Canadian soldier 
 Jan Conrad as Polish soldier 
 Raymond Rollett as The Singer

References

External links

The Cure for Love at BFI Screenonline
Review at Variety

1949 films
1949 romantic comedy films
British romantic comedy films
Films scored by William Alwyn
1940s English-language films
Films shot at Shepperton Studios
British films based on plays
Films set in Lancashire
British black-and-white films
1940s British films